Tertnes Håndball Elite is the women's handball team of the Norwegian multi-sports club Tertnes IL based in Bergen. The team plays in REMA 1000-ligaen, the top division in the country, since its promotion in 1992.

Results

Norway
REMA 1000-ligaen
 Silver: 1998/99, 2003/04, 2008/09
 Bronze: 2001/02, 2004/05, 2005/06, 2010/11, 2012/13, 2013/14, 2014/15, 2018/19
Norwegian Cup
 Silver: 2001/02, 2016

Europe
EHF Cup
 Silver: 1999/00

Team

Current squad
Squad for the 2022–23 season

Goalkeeper
 1  Synna Lien
 24  Josefine Gundersen Lien
Wingers
RW
 5  Henrikke Hauge Kjølholdt 
 18  Rikke Midtfjeld
LW 
 8  Linn Gossé
 22  Maria Bergslien Gald
Line players
 4  Marthe Hatløy Walde
 13  Emma Holtet

Back players
LB
 2  Birgitte Karlsen Hagen
 6  Emilie Fauske Helland
 10  Adine Malen Andreassen
 14  Eva Erdal Moen
 21  Henriette Espetvedt Eggen
CB
 7  Avril Mikkelsen Frei
 15  Henriette Karlsen Risti
 19  Ina Borlaug
 20  Fanny Skindlo
RB
 3  Martine Hellesø Knutsen
 9  Sanne Løkka Hagen
 17  Hermine Motzfeldt Auberg

2023-2024 Transfers

Joining

Leaving
  Henrikke Hauge Kjølholdt (RW) (to  Molde HK)
  Josefine Gundersen Lien (GK) (to  Skövde HF)

Technical staff
 Head coach: Tore Johannessen
 Assistant coach: Jarle Alver
 Goalkeeper coach: Jan Stankiewicz
 Physiotherapist: Martin Flesland

Notable former national team players

  Cecilie Leganger
  Kjersti Grini
  Janne Kolling
  Iris Morhammer
  Terese Pedersen
  Mette Davidsen
  Marianne Rokne
  Mia Hundvin
  Anne Petersen Waage
  Stine Skogrand
  Sakura Hauge
  Kjerstin Boge Solås

Notable former club players

  Hege Christin Vikebø
  Marie Liljegren
  Sissel Nygård Pedersen
  Sølvi Hylleseth
  Stine Lund Andreassen
  Marthe Reinkind
  Renate Urne
  Henriette Sognnæs
  Elise Huseklepp
  Catharina Skorpen Furnes
  Marianne Sundsbak
  Johanne Jerven Hestad
  Karoline Dyrhol Slenes
  Sylvia Linn Hovland
  Nina Arnesen
  Anne Jorunn Kristensen
  Hege Johansen
  Jeanette Haga Holgersen
  Celine Sivertsen
  Marie Davidsen
  Tina Abdulla
  Kristin Nørstebø
  Katarina Berens
  Thea Stankiewicz
  Madeleine Hilby
  Rikke Øyerhamn
  Eli Smørgrav Skogstrand

References

Norwegian handball clubs
Sport in Bergen
Handball clubs established in 1953
1953 establishments in Norway